Westerdale is a village, civil parish and dale within the Scarborough district of North Yorkshire, England. The Esk Valley Walk runs through part of the village. The village is at the confluence of three streams (Esklets) which combine as the head of the River Esk.

According to the 2011 UK census, Westerdale parish had a population of 149, a decrease on the 2001 UK census figure of 175.

Geography

The village
Westerdale village is a single street of around 25 houses, to the north east of a small stream which joins the Esk near Hunters Sty bridge. There is a church – Christ Church, and a small, disused Wesleyan chapel. Close to the church can be found the Village Hall (formerly a small schoolhouse), a postbox and a telephone box.

Westerdale Side
Westerdale Side is part of Westerdale, but is best approached from near the neighbouring village of Castleton. It is accessed by a narrow road running along the southwest of Castleton Rigg.

Westerdale Moor
Westerdale Moor is an extensive upland area surrounding the farmland in Westerdale. At its highest, Westerdale Moor rises to 429 metres in the vicinity of Ralphs Cross, and Baysdale Moor to the south-west reaches 433 metres at Stony Ridge – the second highest point of the North York Moors.

Much of the moor is covered by peat and heather and descending into the dale, bilberry and some bracken can be found, with Soft rush and sphagnum in boggy areas.  Bracken is no longer widespread on Westerdale Moor, since an eradication programme by a previous landowner. There are some trees by the streams which are tributaries of the Esk – mainly Alder, Mountain Ash, Birch, Oak and Holly.  Near Stockdale beck are fragments of ancient woodland on steep slopes and, as in nearby Baysdale, a few junipers can be found. During the 19th century, the moor was the site of several collieries.

The farmed dale
Despite its rather remote upland location, Westerdale has been farmed for thousands of years. Soil types vary across the dale (and often in the same field), through strong clays to free-draining shale. Historically some of the more fertile lower fields grew a range of arable crops particularly barley, oats, turnips and potatoes, but more recently most farms concentrate on grass for grazing and the production of hay and silage as winter feed.

Dividing and stock-proofing the fields, there are many miles of dry stone walls in several styles – and built over a very long timespan. There are also some good hedges and in recent years much work has been done to safeguard and improve both walls and hedges through a National Park sponsored programme.

Westerdale Hall

Westerdale Hall is a substantial stone and slate-roofed building, located close to the west side of the village. It was designed by Thomas Henry Wyatt and originally built as a shooting lodge, mainly for grouse shooting in the late summer and autumn. After the Second World War it became a popular youth hostel, but is now a private residence with many of its original external features remaining intact.

Hunters Sty Bridge
An ancient stone arch over the River Esk near the village.
By the road towards Kildale, but the modern road crosses the Esk by a ford nearby. This route would have been well travelled in the past, as the way to Baysdale Abbey and Gisborough Priory.
The bridge was restored by the Duncombe family in the late 19th century (a date stone on the downstream side states 1874), but the underside of the arch retains interesting Medieval ribbed stonework.
It is thought the Knights Templar may have been involved in the construction; it is of that period.

The Esklets
The River Esk rises as numerous small streams in the upper part of Westerdale, known as "The Esklets" – which is close to neighbouring Farndale. Until recently, water was extracted from these streams for public supply but this is no longer the case and the old pumping station stands empty.

Links with the Knights Templar
Agricultural land and a hall, situated in the Westerdale area, were given to the Order of Knights Templar at an early period in the 12th century. The property was donated by Guido de Bovingcourt who owned the land, together with other holdings in nearby Baysdale (a.k.a. Basedale/Handale/ Grendale). Bovingcourt was a supporter of the Cistercians and donated a number of other lands in the area to them including Battersby, Stokesley, Newby, and Baysdale itself. At Baysdale, he provided a home for a small congregation of Cistercian nuns who lived in a small abbey there, supported by mining and smelting rights near Westerdale village.

The remains of the fortifications of the hall given to the Templars by Bovincourt was situated to the north of the present day Westerdale Hall (formerly a Youth Hostel) and was excavated by the warden's son, Paul Wheater, in 1960. He found evidence of a main chamber together with a kitchen, a brewery, animal quarters and a chapel.

In the book The Story of Danby by the late Dr Bob Robinson (1991), we are told that the Templars of Temple Newsam, Leeds, appointed the then prominent Westerdale Preceptory in 1119 to be the head of the North Yorkshire Templars.

The Preceptory prospered for around two hundred years until 1309 when the Templars were suppressed. William de la Fenne was Westerdale's last preceptor and it is likely that with their impending suppression, he encouraged his Templars to turn much of their valuable goods into cash. A listing of their removable possessions is surprisingly small, particularly in the light of us being told that Westerdale had been declared the 'head Preceptory of North Yorkshire'. The granary contained only 4 bushels (100 kg) of rye.

As to the boundaries of the Templar lands at Westerdale, there is little evidence of their limits. A number of mediaeval crosses and stones stand on the moorland around this area and no doubt some of them could easily be markers for Templar boundaries. The Reverend George Young in his History of Whitby and Streoneshalh Abbey (1817) says:
many [stone crosses and markers] were set up to prevent disputes over territory and serve as landmarks......this plan was especially adopted by the Knights Templars and Hospitallers......

References

External links

Westerdale News
A page on EskValley.com

Villages in North Yorkshire
Civil parishes in North Yorkshire
Valleys of the North York Moors